Nicol Ó Leaáin, Bishop of Kilmacduagh 1358–1393. Ó Leaáin (O'Leane, Lane, Linnane) is associated with the Oranmore-Clarenbridge are of County Galway.

Ó Leaáin was appointed 16 November 1358 and consecrated in 1360. He died before October 1393.

See also

 Mauricius Ó Leaáin, Bishop of Kilmacduagh, 1254–1284.
 Gregorius Ó Leaáin, Bishop of Kilmacduagh, 1394–1397.
 Noel Lane (born 1954), retired Galway Gaelic Athletic Association (GAA) manager.
 Sylvie Linnane (born 1956) retired GAA sportsman.

References

 The Surnames of Ireland, Edward MacLysaght, 1978.

External links
 http://www.ucc.ie/celt/published/T100005C/
 http://www.irishtimes.com/ancestor/surname/index.cfm?fuseaction=Go.&UserID=

People from County Galway
14th-century Roman Catholic bishops in Ireland